Marcel Akerboom (born 28 October 1981 in Leiden) is a retired Dutch footballer, who currently the assistant manager for VV Noordwijk.

Club career
During his career, Akerboom played for Fortuna Sittard, FC Zwolle, HFC Haarlem and VV Noordwijk.

External links
Worldfootball.net profile

1981 births
Living people
Footballers from Leiden
Association football defenders
Dutch footballers
Netherlands youth international footballers
Fortuna Sittard players
VV Noordwijk players
PEC Zwolle players
HFC Haarlem players
Eerste Divisie players
Eredivisie players